Emmanuel Bove (20 April 1898 – 19 July 1945) was a French writer, who also published under the pseudonyms of Pierre Dugast and Jean Vallois.

Life and career
Emmanuel Bove was born Emmanuel Bobovnikoff on 20 April 1898 in Paris to a Jewish father who migrated from Ukraine and a Luxembourgish mother. He studied at the Ecole alsacienne and the lycée Calvin de Genève. At the age of 14, he decided to become a novelist. In 1915, he was sent to boarding school in England, where he completed his education. Returning to Paris in 1916, he found himself in a precarious situation.

In 1921, he married Suzanne Vallois and moved to the suburbs of Vienna. There he began his writing career, publishing numerous popular novels under the pseudonym Jean Vallois. He returned to Paris in 1922 and worked as a journalist. His work came to the attention of Colette, who helped him publish his first novel under his own name, Mes amis (My Friends) in 1924. The novel became a success and he consistently published until the Second World War, winning the prix Figuière in 1928.

In 1940, he was mobilized as a laborer and hoped to be able to flee to London. He was unable to publish during the Occupation. He managed to escape to Algiers in 1942, where he wrote his three final novels: le Piège, Départ dans la nuit and Non-lieu.

He returned to Paris in poor health from diseases caught during his Algerian exile. He died in Paris on July 19, 1945 from Cachexia and heart failure.

Works

Mes amis, novel 1924
Le Crime d'une nuit, novella 1926
Armand, novel 1927
Bécon-les-Bruyères, novel, 1927
La Coalition, novel 1927
La Mort de Dinah, novel 1928
Coeurs et Visages, novel 1928
L'Amour de Pierre Neuhart, novel 1928
Une illusion, novella 1928/1929
Monsieur Thorpe (Les deux masques), 1930
Journal – écrit en hiver, novel 1931
Un Raskolnikoff, novella 1932
Un célibataire, novel 1932
Le Meurtre de Suzy Pommier, crime novel 1933
Le Beau-fils, novel 1934
Le Pressentiment, 1935 (adapted into the film Premonition in 2006)
Adieu Fombonne, novel 1937
La Dernière Nuit, novel 1939
Le Piège, novel 1945
Départ dans la nuit, novel 1945
Non-lieu, novel 1946
Mémoires d'un homme singulier,  1987

Works Available in English
 My Friends, trans. Janet Louth; Manchester: Carcanet, 1986. 
 Armand, trans. Janet Louth; Manchester ; New York, NY : Carcanet, 1987. 
 Winter's Journal, trans. Nathalie Favre-Gilly; Evanston, Ill. : Marlboro Press/Northwestern, 1998. 
 The Murder of Suzy Pommier, trans. Warre B. Wells. Boston : Little, Brown, 1934.
 The Stepson, trans. Nathalie Favre-Gilly; Marlboro, Vt. : Marlboro Press, 1991. 
 Quicksand, trans. Dominic Di Bernardi; Marlboro, Vt. : Marlboro Press, 1993. 
 Night Departure; and No Place, trans. Carol Volk; New York : Four Walls Eight Windows, 1995. 
 A Singular Man, trans. Dominic Di Bernardi; Marlobor, Vt. : Marlboro Press, 1993. 
 A Raskolnikoff, trans. Mitchell Abidor; Red Dust, 2015.  
 Henri Duchemin and His Shadows, trans. Alyson Waters; New York Review of Books Classics, 2015.

References

External links

Website devoted to Bove (in French)

1945 deaths
1898 births
20th-century French novelists
20th-century French non-fiction writers
20th-century French male writers
People of French Algeria
Writers from Paris
20th-century French Jews
French World War II forced labourers